Herpestes lemanensis is an extinct mongoose species that was excavated in Tertiary depositions in France and described by Auguste Pomel in 1853. Its body size equals a large Indian civet, but its dentition resembles that of the Indian grey mongoose.

References

Mongooses
Miocene carnivorans
Miocene mammals of Europe